This is a list of works by the French artist, theoretician, philosopher Albert Gleizes; one of the founders of Cubism and an influence on the School of Paris.

The artistic career of Gleizes spanned more than fifty years, from roughly 1901 to the year of his death in 1953. He was both a prolific painter and writer. This incomplete list is a selection of some of Gleizes' better-known oil paintings, or includes those for which images are available. Also listed is an extensive selection of his writings; both books and articles.

"Gleizes' individual development, his unique struggle to reconcile forces," writes the art historian Daniel Robbins, "made him one of the few painters to come out of Cubism with a wholly individual style, undeflected by later artistic movements. Although he occasionally returned to earlier subjects... these later works were treated anew, on the basis of fresh insights. He never repeated his earlier styles, never remained stationary, but always grew more intense, more passionate. [...] His life ended in 1953 but his paintings remain to testify to his willingness to struggle for final answers. His is an abstract art of deep significance and meaning, paradoxically human even in his very search for absolute order and truth." (Daniel Robbins, 1964)


Paintings

After Albert Gleizes

Published writings

Books
 Du "Cubisme", Albert Gleizes and Jean Metzinger, Paris, Figuière, 1912 (published in English and Russian in 1913, a new edition was published in 1947)
 Du Cubisme et des moyens de le comprendre, Paris, La Cible, Povolozky, 1920 (published in German in 1922).
 La Mission créatrice de l’Homme dans le domaine plastique, Paris, La Cible, Povolozky, 1921 (published in Polish in 1927).
 La Peinture et ses lois, ce qui devait sortir du Cubisme, Paris, 1924 (published in English in 2000)
 Tradition et Cubisme. Vers une conscience plastique. Articles et Conférences 1912–1924, Paris, La Cible, Povolozky, 1927
 Peinture et Perspective descriptive, conference at the Carnegie Foundation for l’Union Intellectuelle française, Paris, 22 March 1927. Sablons, Moly-Sabata, 1927
 Kubismus, Bauhausbücher 13, Munich, Albert Langen Verlag, 1928 (re-edited by Florian Kupferberg Verlag in 1980).
 Vie et Mort de l’Occident Chrétien, Sablons, Moly-Sabata, 1930 (published in English in 1947)
 Vers une Conscience plastique : La Forme et l’Histoire, Paris, Povolozky, 1932
 Art et Science, Sablons, Moly-Sabata, 1933. 2ème édition, Aix-en-Provence, 1961. Conference at Lodz, Poland, 28 April 1932, and Stuttgart, 6 Mai 1932.
 Homocentrisme ; Le retour de l’Homme chrétien; Le Rythme dans les Arts plastiques, Sablons, Moly-Sabata, 1937
 La Signification Humaine du Cubisme, Lecture by Albert Gleizes at the Petit Palais, Paris, 18 July 1938, Sablons, Moly-Sabata, 1938
 Du Cubisme, Albert Gleizes and Jean Metzinger, Paris, Compagnie Française des Arts Graphiques, 1947 (re-edition of the 1912 book with slight modifications and a new Preface by Albert Gleizes).
 Souvenirs, le Cubisme 1908–1914, Lyon, Cahiers Albert Gleizes, L’Association des Amis d’Albert Gleizes, 1957	
 Puissances du Cubisme, Chambéry, éditions Présence, 1969. Collection of articles published between 1925 and 1946
 Art et religion, Art et science, Art et production, Chambéry, éditions Présence, 1970 (published in English in 2000)	
 L'Homme devenu peintre, Paris, Fondation Albert Gleizes and Somogy éditions d'Art, 1998

Articles
 L'Art et ses représentants. Jean Metzinger, Revue Indépendante, Paris, September 1911, pp. 161–172
 Le Fauconnier et son oeuvre, Revue Indépendante, Paris, October 1911 Unlocated article listed in Le Fauconnier bibliographies
 Les Beaux Arts. A propos du Salon d'Automne, Les Bandeaux d'Or, séries 4, no. 13, 1911–1912, pp. 42–51
 "Cubisme devant les Artistes", Les Annates politiques et littéraires, Paris, December 1912, pp. 473–475. A response to an inquiry
 Le Cubisme et la Tradition, Montjoie, Paris, 10 February 1913, p. 4. Reprinted in Tradition et Cubisme, Paris, 1927
 [Extracts from O Kubisme], Soyuz Molodezhi, Sbornik, St. Petersburg, no. 3, 1913. With commentary. Reference from gray, Camilla. The Great Experiment: Russian Art, 1893–1922, New York, Abrams, 1962, p. 308
 Opinions (Mes Tableaux), Montjoie, Paris, nos. 11–12, November–December 1913, p. 14
 C’est en allant se jeter à la mer que le fleuve reste fidèle à sa source, Le Mot, Paris, vol. I, no. 17, 1 Mai 1915
 French Artists Spur on American Art, New York Herald, 24 October 1915, pp. 2–3. An interview
 Interview with Gleizes (Duchamp, Picabia and Crotti), The Literary Digest, New York, 27 November 1915, pp. 1224–1225
 "La Peinture Moderne", 391, New York, no. 5, June 1917, pp. 6–7
 The Abbey of Créteil, A Communistic Experiment, The Modern School, Stelton, New Jersey, October 1918. Edited by Carl Zigrosser
 The Impersonality of American Art, Playboy, New York, nos. 4 and 5, 1919, pp. 25–26. Translated by Stephen Bourgeois. Preface to an exhibition of modern art at the Bourgeois Galleries, New York, 1919
 "Vers une epoque de batisseurs", Clarte (Bulletin Français), Paris, 1920, no. 13, 14, 15, 32
 Letter to Herwarth Walden, 30 April 1920, Der Sturm, Berlin, Nationalgalerie, September, 1961, p. 46
 L’Affaire dada. Action, Paris, no. 3, April 1920, pp. 26–32. Re-printed in English in Motherwell, Robert, ed. Dada Painters and Poets, New York, 1951, pp. 298–302
 Dieu Nouveau, La Vie des Lettres, Paris, October 1920, p. 178
 Réhabilitation des Arts Plastiques, La Vie des Lettres et des Arts, Paris, series 2, no. 4, April 1921, pp. 411–122. Reprinted in Tradition et Cubisme, Paris, 1927
 L'Etat du Cubisme aujourd'hui, La Vie des Lettres et des Arts, Paris, series 2, no. 15, 1922, pp. 13–17
 Tradition und Freiheit, Das Kunstblatt, Berlin, vol. 6, no. 1, 1922, pp. 26–32
 Ein Neuer Naturalismus? Eine Rundfrage des Kunstblatts, Das Kunstblatt, Berlin, vol. 6, no. 9, 1922, pp. 387–389. Reply to an inquiry
 "Perle", La Bataille Littéraire, Brussels, vol. 4, no. 2, 25 February 1922, pp. 35–36 [A poem, New York, 1916]
 La Peinture et ses Lois : Ce qui devait sortir du Cubisme, La Vie des Lettres et des Arts, Paris, series 2, no. 12, March 1923, pp. 26–73
 Jean Lurcat, Das Kunstblatt, vol. 7, no. 8, 1923, pp. 225–228
 L’Art moderne et la Société nouvelle, Moniteur de l’Académie Socialiste, Moscou, 1923. Reprinted in Tradition et Cubisme, Paris, 1927, pp. 149–161
 Où va la peinture moderne? Bulletin de l’Effort Moderne, Paris, no. 5, May 1924, p. 14. Response to an inquiry
 La Renaissance et la peinture d'aujourd'hui, La Vie des Lettres et des Arts, Paris, décembre 1924 (repris dans Tradition et Cubisme, Paris, 1927, p. 179–191)
 La Peinture et ses Lois, Bulletin de l’Effort Moderne, Paris, no. 5, May 1924, p. 4–9, no. 13, March 1925, p. 1–4
 A propos de la Section d'Or de 1912, Les Arts Plastiques, Paris, no. 1, January,1925, pp. 5–7
 Chez les Cubistes: une enquête, Bulletin de la Vie Artistique, Paris, vol. 6, no. 1, January 1925, pp. 15–19. Response to an inquiry
 L’inquiétude, Crise plastique, La Vie des Lettres et des Arts, Paris, series 2, no. 20, May 1925, pp. 38–52
 A l'Exposition, que pensez-vous du... Pavilion de Russie, Bulletin de la Vie Artistique, vol. 6, no. 11, 1 June 1925, pp. 235–237. Response to an inquiry
 "Cubisme", La Vie des Lettres et des Arts, Paris, series 2, no. 21, 1926, pp. 51–65. Announced as French text of Kubismus, Bauhausbücher 13, Munich, 1928, written in September 1925, at Serrieres
 Cubisme (Vers une conscience plastique). Bulletin de l'Effort Moderne, Paris, no. 22, February 1926; no. 23, March 1926; no. 24, April 1926; no. 25, May, 1926; no. 26, June 1926; no. 27, July 1926; no. 28, October 1926; no. 29, November 1926; no. 30, December 1926; no. 31, January 1927; no. 32, February 1927. Extracts, announced as partial contents of Kubismus, Bauhausbücher 13, 1928
 L’Epopée. De la Forme immobile à la Forme mobile, Le Rouge et le Noir, Paris, October 1929, pp. 57–99. The final French text of Kubismus, Bauhausbücher 13, Munich, Albert Langen Verlag, 1928 (re-edited by Florian Kupferberg Verlag in 1980).
 Charles Henry et le Vitalisme, Cahiers de l'Etoile, Paris, no. 13, January–February 1930, pp. 112–128. [Preface to La Forme et l'Histoire], l'Alliance Universelle, Paris, 30 April 1930
 Les Attitudes Fondamentales de l'Esprit Moderne, Bulletin de la VIIème Congrès de la Fédération Internationale des Unions Intellectuelles, Cracow, October 1930. [Preface to an Exhibition of Paintings by Gottfried Graf, Berlin, 1931]. Quoted in Chevalier, Le Dénouement traditionnel du Cubisme, 2, Confluences, Lyon, no. 8, February 1942, p. 193
 Civilization et Propositions, La Semaine Egyptienne, Alexandria, 31 October 1932, p. 5
 Moly-Sabata ou le Retour des Artistes au Village, Sud Magazine, Marseilles, no. 1021, 1 June 1932. [Statement], Abstraction-Creation, Art Non-Figuratif, Paris, no. 1, 1932, pp. 15–16
 La Grande Ville et Ses Signes, La Liberté, Paris, 7 May 1933, p. 2
 Vers la régénération intellectuelle, Naturisme du corps: naturisme de l'esprit, Régénération, Paris, new series, no. 46, July–August 1933, pp. 117–119. [Statement], Abstraction-Creation, Art Non-Figuratif, Paris, no. 2, 1933, p. 18
 Vers une conscience plastique, La Forme et l'Histoire, Sud, magazine méditerranéen, no. 104, 1–16 July 1933, p. 20–21
 Propos de peintre, Almanach vivarois 1933, Sous le signe de July 1933, p. 30–34. May 2007
 Le Retour de l’Homme à sa Vie, Jeunesse, and Jeunesse (suite), Régénération, Paris, no. 49, 50, 53, 1934. [Expose] Abstraction-Création, Art Non Figuratif, Paris, no. 3, 1934, p. 18
 Agriculture et Machinisme, Regeneration, Paris, no. 53, August–September 1934, pp. 11–14. Enlarged version of article originally published in Lyon Republicain, 1 January 1932
 Le Groupe de l'Abbaye. La Nouvelle Abbaye de Moly-Sabata, Cahiers Américains, Paris, New York, no. 6, Winter, 1934, pp. 253–259
 Le Retour à la Terre, Beaux-Arts, Paris, 14 December 1934, p. 2
 Peinture et Peinture, Sud Magazine, Marseilles, no. 8, August 1935. Offprint. (In Puissances du Cubisme, 1969, pp. 185–199)
 Retour à l’Homme. Mais à quel Homme?, December 1935. Offprint, Sud Magazine, Marseilles. (In Puissances du Cubisme, 1969, pp. 201–218)
 Arabesques, Cahiers du Sud, (special edition), L’Islam et l’Occident, vol. 22, no. 175, August–September, 1935, pp. 101–106. (In Puissances du Cubisme, 1969, pp. 169–175)
 Article dated Serrieres d'Ardeche, November, 1934. [Statement], Abstraction-Creation, Art Non-Figuratif, Paris, no. 5, 1936, pp. 7–8
 La Question de Métier, Beaux-Arts, Paris, 9 October 1936, p. 1
 Art Régional, Tous les Arts à Paris, Paris, 15 December 1936
 Le Problème de la Lumière, Cahiers du Sud, vol. 24, no. 192, March 1937, pp. 190–207. (From d'Homocentrisme, also in Puissance du cubisme, 1969, pp. 245–267)
 Cubisme et Surréalisme: Deux Tentatives Pour Redécouvrir l'Homme, Deuxiéme Congrés international d'esthétique et de science de l'art, Paris, 1937, II p. 337. (In Puissances du cubisme, 1969, p. 269–282)
 Tradition et Modernisme, l'Art et les Artistes, Paris, no. 37, January 1939, pp. 109–115
 L'Oeuvre de Maurice Garnier, Sud Magazine, Marseille, mars-avril 1939, p. 15–17
 Artistes et Artisans, L’Opinion, Cannes, 31 May 1941
 Spiritualité, Rythme, Forme, Confluences: Les Problèmes de la Peinture, Lyon, 1945, section 6. Special edition, edited by Gaston Diehl. (In Puissance du cubisme, 1969, p. 315–344)
 Apollinaire, la Justice et Moi, Guillaume Apollinaire, Souvenirs et Témoignages, Paris, Editions de la Tête Noire, 1946, pp. 53–65. Edited by Marcel Adema
 L’Arc en Ciel, clé de l’Art chrétien médiéval, Les Etudes Philosophiques, new series, no. 2, April–June 1946. [Statement], Realites Nouvelles, Paris, no. 1, 1947, pp. 34–35 (In Puissances du cubisme, 1969, p. 345–357)
 Réalités Nouvelles, Paris, no. 1, 1947, p. 34–35. Préliminaires à une étude sur les variations iconographiques de la Croix, Témoignages, Cahiers de la Pierre-qui-Vire, no. 15, October 1947
 Life and Death of the Christian West, Londres, Dennis Dobson Ltd., 1947. Preface by H. J. Massingham, translation by Aristide Messinesi
 Y a-t-il un Art Traditionnel Chrétien ?, Témoignages, Cahiers de la Pierre-qui-Vire, July 1948
 L’Art Sacré est Théologique et Symbolique, Arts, Paris, no. 148, 9 January 1948, p. 8
 Active Tradition of the East and West, Art and Thought, Londres, February 1948, p. 244–251 (Ananda K. Coomaraswamy, homage)
 Pourquoi j'illustre Les Pensées de Pascal, Arts, 24 March 1950, p. 1–2
 Introduction au catalogue de l'exposition Les Pensées de Pascal, Chapelle de l’Oratoire, Avignon, 22 July – 31 August 1950
 Peinture d’Opinion et Peinture de Métier, L’Atelier de la Rose, Lyon, June 1951
 Réflexions sur l’Art dit Abstrait et du Caractère de l’Image dans la Non-Figuration, I, L’Atelier de la Rose, Lyon, October 1951
 Réflexions sur l’Art dit Abstrait et du Caractère de l’Image dans la Non-Figuration, II, L’Atelier de la Rose, Lyon, January 1952
 L’Esprit fondamental de l’Art roman, L’Atelier de la Rose, Lyon, September 1952
 Mentalité Renouvelée, I, L’Atelier de la Rose, Lyon, December 1952
 Présence d’Albert Gleizes, Zodiaque, Saint-Léger-Vauban, no. 6-7, January 1952
 L’Esprit de ma fresque : L’Eucharistie, L’Atelier de la Rose, Lyon, March 1953.
 Mentalité Renouvelée, Il, L’Atelier de la Rose, Lyon, June 1953, pp. 452–460.
 Conformisme, Réforme et Révolution, Correspondances, Tunis, no. 2, 1954, p. 39–45. (With a biographical note by Jean Cathelin)
 Un potier [sur Anne Dangar ], La belle Journée est passée, Zodiaque, Saint-Léger-Vauban, no. 25, April 1955.
 Caractères de l’Art Celtique, Actualité de l’Art Celtique, Cahiers d’Histoire et de Folklore, Lyon, 1956, pp. 55–97 (extraits de La Forme et l’Histoire, 1932)
 Souvenirs, le Cubisme 1908–1914, Lyon, Cahiers Albert Gleizes, L’Association des Amis d’Albert Gleizes, 1957 (from Souvenirs, manuscript conserved at the Kandinsky Library / Centre Pompidou, Paris)
 Introduction à Mainie Jellett, The Artists’ Vision, Dundalk, Dundalgan Press, 1958, pp. 25–45 (written in 1948)
 Puissances du Cubisme, Chambéry, éditions Présence, 1969 (articles published between 1925 and 1946)
 Art et religion, Art et science, Art et production, Chambéry, éditions Présence, 1970. (English edition by Peter Brooke, 1999)
 Fragments de notes inédites (1946), Zodiaque, n° 100, April 1974, pp. 39–74
 Du Cubisme, Jean Metzinger, Aubard (éditions Présence), 1980 (re-edition of the 1947 version with an introduction by Daniel Robbins)
 Albert Gleizes en 1934, Ampuis, Association des Amis d'Albert Gleizes, 1991. (from Souvenirs, manuscript conserved at the Kandinsky Library / Centre Pompidou, Paris)
 Sujet et objet, deux lettres adressées à André Lhote, Ampuis, Association des Amis d’Albert Gleizes, 1996

References

 
Gleizes